Karen Le Comber (born 5 July 1969) is a New Zealand former cricketer who played as a right-handed batter. She appeared in 15 One Day Internationals for New Zealand in 1996 and 1997. She mainly played domestic cricket for Canterbury, whilst also representing Southern Districts, Canterbury B and Pub Charities XI.

References

External links

1969 births
Living people
Cricketers from Christchurch
New Zealand women cricketers
New Zealand women One Day International cricketers
Canterbury Magicians cricketers
Southern Districts women cricketers